Imogen Annesley (born 28 May 1970) is an Australian actress and director who is perhaps best known for her performances in the films Playing Beatie Bow, Howling III: The Marsupials and Queen of the Damned.

Annesley made her feature film debut as a teenager, with the leading role of Abigail Kirk in the 1986 Australian film Playing Beatie Bow. A time travel drama based on the novel by Ruth Park and directed by Donald Crombie, it was a failure at the box-office despite a number of positive reviews of the film and Annesley's performance. The film proved more popular on video release.

Her television credits include: Families, Water Rats, Farscape, Above the Law, Blue Water High and East of Everything.

Annesley is also the lady with the child in the Jimmy Barnes 1987 Australian music video, I'm Still On Your Side,  filmed at Sydney's picturesque Hawkesbury River Train Station.–here

Filmography
 1986  Playing Beatie Bow  Feature Film, as Abigail Kirk (Leading Role)
 1987 Vietnam TV Mini-Series Episodes: 1.1, 1.5 as Annie Phelan (9th Billing)
 1987 Howling III: The Marsupials Feature Film, as Jerboa (2nd Billing)
 1987 Future Past TV Movie, as Simone (2nd Billing)
 1989 Crossbow (aka William Tell) Episode 3.4:" Doppelganger", as Pamenta (Main Guest Star)
 1989 Strapless Feature Film, as Imogen (Bit Part)
 1989 Candy Regentag Feature Film, as Sascha (12th Billing)
 1990 Flair TV Mini-Series, as Sally Clarke (6th Billing)
 1990 Families TV Series Episodes: 1.1,1.46,1.55, as Justine Stevens (Main Guest Star)
 1991 Sweet Talker Feature Film, as Salesperson (Bit Part)
 1992 Garbo Feature Film, as Jane (5th Billing)
 1993 The Nostradamus Kid Feature Film, as Beat Girl (Bit Part)
 1997 Emmerdale: The Dingles Down Under Video, as Wendy Dingle (Bit Part)
 1997 Water Rats (TV series) TV Series Episodes: "Import/Export", "Jilted" as Jennifer Campbell (Main Guest Star)
 2000 Farscape TV Series Episodes: "Nerve","Hidden Memory" as Niem (10th and 12th Billing)
 2000 Pizza TV Series Episode: "Love Pizza" as Angelina (Main Guest Star)
 2000 Above the Law TV Series Episode: "Friendship First" as Anna King (2nd Guest Star)
 2000 Tales of the South Seas TV Series Episode: "The Statue" (Guest Star)
 2002 Queen of the Damned Feature Film, as Club Vampire (Minor Role)
 2002 The Outsider TV Movie, as Bar Girl (Bit Part)
 2005 Blue Water High TV Series Episode: "Peri Lies Low", as Karen Moss (Guest Star)
 2007 Cross Life Feature Film, as Zana (Top Billing)
 2008–9 ''East of Everything TV Series Episodes: 1.1 to 1.6, as Suzy Barns (11th Billing)

Theatre

References

External links
 

Australian television actresses
Australian film actresses
Living people
Actresses from Adelaide
1970 births